Philip William Clifford Stokes, OBE (25 October 1906 – 18 October 1983) was an Australian politician. Born in Melbourne, he attended state schools and then Austral College. He was a bank officer before serving in the military 1940–45. On his return, he was an auctioneer and real estate agent. In 1955, he was elected to the Australian House of Representatives as the Liberal member for Maribyrnong. He held the seat until his defeat in 1969. Stokes died in 1983.

References

Liberal Party of Australia members of the Parliament of Australia
Members of the Australian House of Representatives for Maribyrnong
Members of the Australian House of Representatives
Australian Officers of the Order of the British Empire
Australian auctioneers
1906 births
1983 deaths
20th-century Australian politicians
Politicians from Melbourne